Bodla Bahar was a faithful partisan and devotee of Lal Shahbaz Qalandar. His mausoleum is in Sehwan Sharif, Sindh, Pakistan. His original name was Sikander. According to legends Bodla Bahar was already resident of Sehwan Sharif before coming of Qalandar Lal Shahbaz. Later, he turned to the circle of affectionate believers of the saint. He was the most reliable and trustworthy servant of Qalandar. Several myths have been related to Bodla Bahar concerning Qalandar Shahbaz. It is believed that Bodla Bahar was killed and his flesh was sold in market by butcher Annud. When Qalandar knew he called Bodla three times. After calling, the pieces of flesh of Bodla came to Qalandar and he was restored into life by Qalandar.

References

Sufi saints
Shrines in Pakistan
Lal Shahbaz Qalandar